Thomas Dunne (born April 21, 1943) is a British geomorphologist and hydrologist who is a professor at the University of California, Santa Barbara's Bren School of Environmental Science & Management and Department of Earth Science since 1995. From 1973 to 1995 he was a professor at the University of Washington's Department of Geological Sciences where his research focused on landslides.

His degrees are in physical geography, obtaining a B.A. from Cambridge University in 1964, and a Ph.D. in 1969 from The Johns Hopkins University. He is the coauthor, with Luna Leopold, of Water in Environmental Planning.

References

External links
 Dunne's website at UCSB

American geologists
American geomorphologists
University of California, Santa Barbara faculty
Members of the United States National Academy of Sciences
Fellows of the American Geophysical Union
Alumni of the University of Cambridge
1943 births
Living people